Pseudomogrus knappi is a species of jumping spider in the genus Pseudomogrus that lives in Yemen and Sudan. The female was first described in 1994. The species was originally known as Yllenus knappi, but was moved to the genus Logunyllus in 2016 and then subsequently to Pseudomogrus in 2019.

References

Salticidae
Spiders of Asia
Spiders described in 1994
Taxa named by Wanda Wesołowska